Mount Gould could be:

 Mount Gould (Montana) in Glacier National Park, United States
 Mount Gould (California) in Sierra Nevada, United States
 Mount Gould (Plymouth), a suburb in Plymouth, Devon, England
 Mount Gould (Tasmania) in the Cradle Mountain-Lake St Clair National Park, Australia
Mount Gould (Antarctica)
 Mount Gould Station, a pastoral lease in the Mid West of Western Australia